Teatro Verdi may refer to:

 Teatro Verdi (Brindisi), Brindisi
 Teatro Giuseppe Verdi, Busseto
 Teatro Verdi (Florence), Florence
 Teatro Verdi (Padova), Padova, by architect Achille Sfondrini
 Teatro Verdi (Pisa), Pisa
 Teatro Verdi (Salerno), Salerno
 Teatro Verdi (San Severo), San Severo
 Teatro Verdi (Sassari), Sassari
 Teatro Lirico Giuseppe Verdi, Trieste

See also
 Memorials to Giuseppe Verdi